Dieter Julius Cronenberg (8 February 1930 – 21 November 2013) was a German politician of the Free Democratic Party (FDP) and former member of the German Bundestag.

Biography 
From 1976 to 1994, Cronenberg was a member of the German Bundestag. From 1979 to 1985 he was deputy chairman of the FDP parliamentary group in the Bundestag. In December 1984, he was elected Vice President of the German Bundestag to succeed Richard Wurbs and remained so for over ten years until he left the Bundestag in 1994.

Literature

References

1930 births
2013 deaths
Members of the Bundestag for North Rhine-Westphalia
Members of the Bundestag 1990–1994
Members of the Bundestag 1987–1990
Members of the Bundestag 1983–1987
Members of the Bundestag 1980–1983
Members of the Bundestag 1976–1980
Members of the Bundestag for the Free Democratic Party (Germany)